Vladan Zagrađanin (born 30 May 1968) is a politician in Serbia. He has served in the National Assembly of Serbia since 2016 as a member of the Socialist Party of Serbia (SPS).

Private life and career
Zagrađanin is a graduate of the University of Belgrade Faculty of Law. His party biography indicates that he has served as president of the Youth Council of Belgrade and secretary-general of the Belgrade Ecological Center, was executive director of the public enterprise Srbijašume from 1998 to 2000, and was on the steering committee on the State Lottery of Serbia from 2004 to 2006. He lives in the Belgrade municipality of New Belgrade.

He is kum to Socialist Party leader Ivica Dačić.

Political career
Zagrađanin has been a member of the Socialist Party of Serbia since its formation in 1990 and is a member of its presidency and main board. From 2003 to 2006, he was the party's business director.

He received the seventy-ninth position on the Socialist Party's electoral list in the 2003 Serbian parliamentary election. The party won twenty-two seats, and he was not selected for its assembly delegation. (Between 2000 and 2011, Serbian parliamentary mandates were awarded to sponsoring parties or coalitions rather than to individual candidates, and it was common practice for mandates to be awarded out of numerical order. Zagrađanin's relatively low position on the list – which was, in any event, mostly arranged in alphabetical order – would not have prevented him from being awarded a mandate, although he was ultimately not selected by the party).

Zagrađanin was arrested in January 2006 for allegedly attempting to bribe Dejan Simić, a deputy director of the National Bank of Serbia, with 100,000 Euros to reinstate the operating permit for the Kreditno-Eksportna Banka. This case attracted international attention, and was dubbed the "suitcase affair" in the Serbian media as the money had been found in a suitcase. Both Simić and Zagrađanin were acquitted by the Higher Court of Belgrade in May 2010, and the acquittal was upheld by the Belgrade Court of Appeal in 2011. During the trial, Dačić testified that he believed Simić and Zagrađanin had been unfairly targeted.

Serbia's electoral system was reformed in 2011, such that parliamentary mandates were awarded in numerical order to candidates on successful lists. Zagrađanin received the sixty-fourth position on the Socialist Party's electoral list for the 2014 parliamentary election. The list won forty-four seats, and he was not elected. He was promoted to the twentieth position in the 2016 parliamentary election and was on this occasion elected to the assembly when the list won twenty-nine seats.

He is currently a member of the assembly's defence and internal affairs committee, a deputy member of the security services control committee, and a member of the parliamentary friendship groups with Austria, Belarus, Belgium, China, Germany, Japan, Kazakhstan, Luxembourg, Montenegro, Russia, Turkey, and the United States of America. There were some reports in 2017 that he could be appointed to a government post, though ultimately this did not occur.

References

1968 births
Living people
Politicians from Belgrade
Members of the National Assembly (Serbia)
Socialist Party of Serbia politicians